Myrhorod Raion (translit.: Myrhorods'kyi raion) is a raion (district) in Poltava Oblast of central Ukraine. The raion's administrative center is the city of Myrhorod. Population: 

On 18 July 2020, as part of the administrative reform of Ukraine, the number of raions of Poltava Oblast was reduced to four, and the area of Myrhorod Raion was significantly expanded.  The January 2020 estimate of the raion population was 

Important rivers within the Myrhorodskyi Raion include the Psel and the Khorol. The raion was established on July 3, 1923, by splitting off Lubny Raion. The raion's current boundaries were established on January 8, 1966.

An important village in the raion is Velyki Sorochyntsi, where the Sorochyntsi Fair has been held since the 1960s. On , writer Nikolai Gogol was born in Velyki Sorochyntsi. His short story "The Fair at Sorochyntsi" takes place in Velyki Sorochyntsi.

Settlements

References

Raions of Poltava Oblast
1923 establishments in Ukraine